Yassougou is a village in the Coalla Department of Gnagna Province in eastern Burkina Faso. In 2005 the village had an estimated population of 658.

References

Populated places in the Est Region (Burkina Faso)
Gnagna Province